Kuganakbash (Quğanaqbaş) is a rural locality (a selo) and the administrative centre of Kuganakbashevsky Selsoviet, Sterlibashevsky District, Bashkortostan, Russia. The population was 835 as of 2010. There are 10 streets.

Geography 
Kuganakbash is located 22 km northeast of Sterlibashevo (the district's administrative centre) by road. Yumaguzino is the nearest rural locality.

References 

Rural localities in Sterlibashevsky District